Allens West is a railway station on the Tees Valley Line, which runs between  and  via . It is owned by Network Rail and managed by Northern Trains.

History
Opened by the London and North Eastern Railway during the Second World War as an unadvertised station to serve a nearby Royal Navy stores depot. The station then passed on to the Eastern Region of British Railways on nationalisation in 1948.

Following the construction of new housing in the area, the station became an advertised public station on 3 October 1971. When Sectorisation was introduced, the station was served by Regional Railways until the Privatisation of British Railways.

In autumn 2013, the station's level crossing was upgraded by Network Rail. The half barriers were replaced with full barriers, after several reports of "near misses" with pedestrians avoiding the lowered barriers and crossing the tracks in front of approaching trains.

Facilities
The station is unmanned and has no permanent buildings other than standard waiting shelters on each platform. Ticket Machines are now available on each platform but you can still purchase a ticket on the train. Facilities here were improved in April 2013. The package for this station included new fully lit waiting shelters, renewed station signage, digital CIS displays and the installation of CCTV. The long-line Public Address system (PA) has been renewed and upgraded with pre-recorded train announcements.  Train running information can be obtained via the public payphone on platform 2 and timetable posters.  Step-free access is available to both platforms via the nearby level crossing.

Services
As of the May 2021 timetable change, the station is served by two trains per hour between Saltburn and Darlington via Middlesbrough, with one train per hour extending to Bishop Auckland. An hourly service operates between Saltburn and Bishop Auckland on Sunday. All services are operated by Northern Trains.

Rolling stock used: Class 156 Super Sprinter and Class 158 Express Sprinter

References

Sources

External links
 

Railway stations in the Borough of Stockton-on-Tees
DfT Category F2 stations
Former London and North Eastern Railway stations
Railway stations in Great Britain opened in 1943
Northern franchise railway stations